Green Township is one of nine townships in Hancock County, Indiana, United States. As of the 2010 census, its population was 1,662 and it contained 663 housing units.

History
Green Township was organized in 1832. It was named for John Green, a pioneer settler.

Geography

Unincorporated towns
 Eden
 Milners Corner
(This list is based on USGS data and may include former settlements.)

Adjacent townships
 Fall Creek Township, Madison County (north)
 Brown Township (east)
 Jackson Township (southeast)
 Center Township (south)
 Vernon Township (west)
 Green Township, Madison County (northwest)

Cemeteries
The township contains four cemeteries: Chappell, Cook, Olvey and Wynn.

Major highways
  Indiana State Road 9
  Indiana State Road 234

References
 
 United States Census Bureau cartographic boundary files

External links
 Indiana Township Association
 United Township Association of Indiana

Townships in Hancock County, Indiana
Townships in Indiana